Bobby Steele (born  Robert Charles Kaufhold on March 18, 1956) is an American punk rock musician. He is the current guitar player, songwriter, and sole original member of the punk band The Undead. He has been a member of multiple other bands, most notably, as the second guitarist of The Misfits. He was replaced by Doyle Wolfgang von Frankenstein. He married Diana Viar who joined The Undead in November 2014. They are both in the band RIP which started in 2013.

Career
Steele grew up in New Milford, New Jersey and lived there until 1978 when he moved into Manhattan. The house he had lived in later became the base for Post Mortem records, a label he founded.

Steele was the guitarist for Parrotox, Slash, and The Whorelords before joining The Misfits in 1978. While with The Misfits, he performed on the Horror Business, Night of the Living Dead and 3 Hits from Hell EPs and his playing can also be heard on the Beware and Halloween EPs as well as the "missing" Misfits album 12 Hits from Hell. After being replaced in October 1980 by Jerry Only's younger brother Doyle Wolfgang von Frankenstein, Steele formed The Undead with Chris Natz and Patrick Blanck. The band released their debut EP, 9 Toes Later, in 1982, which Glenn Danzig helped finance. The Undead have undergone many personnel changes throughout the years and today, Steele is the only remaining original member and chief songwriter of the band.

He has also played with Sloppy Seconds, Times Square, The Migraines, and The Graveyard School.

Discography

The Misfits
 Horror Business (1979) – EP
 Night of the Living Dead (1979) – single
 Beware (on "Horror Business", and "Teenagers From Mars") (1980) – EP
 3 Hits from Hell (on "London Dungeon") (1981) – EP
 Halloween (on "Halloween II") (1981) – single
 12 Hits from Hell (2001) – LP

The Undead

Albums
 Never Say Die (1986) – LP, cassette
 Act Your Rage (1989) – LP, cassette
 Dawn Of The Undead (1991) – LP, CD, cassette
 Live Slayer (1992) – LP, CD, cassette
 The Undead (1995) – cassette
 Til Death (1998) – LP, CD
 Still The Undead After All These Years (2007) – CD, LP
 12 Hits From Hell - Uncovered (2007) - digital-only 
 Bobby (aka Bobby Steele) (2009)-  LP, CD
 The Morgue The Merrier (2015)- CD, LP

EPs
 9 Toes Later (1982) – 7-inch EP
 Times Square (2000) – split 7-inch EP
 Third World U S A (2002) 4-song EP
 Rockn'Roll Whore (2002) 4-song EP
 Be My Ghoul Tonight (2003) 4-song EP
 I Made a Monster (2009)- 3-song EP
 Having An Undead Summer (2017)- 4-song EP

Singles
 Verbal Abuse (1983) – 7-inch single
 Never Say Die (1985) – 7-inch single
 Invisible Man (1992) – 7-inch single
 Evening Of Desire (1992) – 12-inch single
 There's A Riot In Tompkins Square (1993) – 7-inch single
 Halloween- (2007)- 7” single

References

1956 births
Living people
People from New Milford, New Jersey
American punk rock guitarists
Horror punk musicians
Misfits (band) members
The Undead members
People with spina bifida
American male guitarists
20th-century American guitarists